Yuri Ivanovich Zhuravlyov (14 January 1935 – 14 January 2022) was a Soviet and Russian mathematician specializing in the algebraic theory of algorithms. His research in applied mathematics and computer science was foundational for a number of specialties within discrete mathematics, pattern recognition, and predictive analysis. Zhuravlyov was a full member of the Russian Academy of Sciences and the chairman of its "Applied Mathematics and Informatics" section. He was also the editor-in-chief of the international journal Pattern Recognition and Image Analysis.

Biography
Zhuravlyov was born on 14 January 1935 in Voronezh in the former Soviet Union. In 1952, after finishing high school, he applied and was accepted into the Mathematics Department at Moscow State University. Under the direction of Alexey Lyapunov, he completed his first serious work on the minimization of partially defined boolean functions. The work was published in 1955 and awarded first prize at the All-Soviet student research competition.

In 1957, Zhuravlyov completed his master's thesis on a solution to the problem of finding words in a finite set with consideration for its construction. In 1959, he completed his doctoral work which involved a proof for lack of local unsolvability for constructing the minimal disjunctive normal form.

In 1959, he moved to Novosibirsk, where he pursued government-sponsored research and taught algebra and mathematical logic at the Novosibirsk University. In 1966, he began research into pattern recognition. His first serious work in this field related to the identification of deposits in the area of gold mining. He then developed a model of algorithms for calculating estimates that became foundational for numerous subsequent research and works in the field.

In 1969, Zhuravlyov moved to Moscow to head the Pattern Recognition Lab at the Central Soviet Computing Center. In 1970, he also joined the faculty of the Moscow Institute of Physics and Technology as a full professor.

Throughout the 1970s and 1980s, Zhuravlyov published a series of seminal works in applied mathematics and informatics. In 1991, he founded the journal Pattern Recognition and Image Analysis. In 1992, he was invited to join the Russian Academy of Sciences. In 1997, he became a professor at Moscow State University.

Zhuravlyov died in Moscow on 14 January 2022, on his 87th birthday.

References

External links
 Maik journal page
 Mathematics Genealogy Project
 Springer journal page

1935 births
2022 deaths
20th-century Russian mathematicians
21st-century Russian mathematicians
People from Voronezh
Corresponding Members of the USSR Academy of Sciences
Full Members of the Russian Academy of Sciences
Honorary Members of the Russian Academy of Education
Academic staff of Moscow State University
Academic staff of Novosibirsk State University
Lenin Prize winners
Recipients of the Order "For Merit to the Fatherland", 3rd class
Recipients of the Order "For Merit to the Fatherland", 4th class
Recipients of the Order of Friendship of Peoples
Recipients of the Order of the Red Banner of Labour
Russian mathematicians
Soviet mathematicians
Burials in Troyekurovskoye Cemetery